Jonathan Bailey (born 1988) is a British actor.

Jonathan Bailey may also refer to:

People
 Jonathan Bailey (bishop) (1940–2008), British bishop
 Jonathan W. Bailey, American rear admiral

Other uses
 Jonathan Bailey House (disambiguation)
 Jonathan Bailey School, Whittier City School District, Whittier, California, USA

See also

 John Bailey (disambiguation)
 Bailey (disambiguation)